Psalm 116 is the 116th psalm of the Book of Psalms, beginning in English in the King James Version: "I love the LORD, because he hath heard my voice and my supplications". It is part of the Egyptian Hallel sequence in the Book of Psalms.

In the slightly different numbering system in the Greek Septuagint and the Latin Vulgate version of the Bible, this psalm begins with Psalm 114, counted as verses 1–9 of Psalm 116, combined with Psalm 115 for the remaining verses. In Latin, Psalm 114 is known as "Dilexi quoniam exaudiet Dominus", and Psalm 115 is known as "Credidi propter quod locutus sum". Psalm 116 in Hebrew is the fourth psalm in the “Egyptian Hallel”. The Septuagint and Vulgate open with the word "Alleluia", whereas the Hebrew version has this word at the end of the preceding psalm.

Psalm 116 is used as a regular part of Jewish, Catholic, Lutheran, Anglican and other Protestant liturgies. It has often been set to music, including settings by Marc-Antoine Charpentier, Anton Bruckner and Franz Schreker.

Language 
Psalm 116 is without a title in the Hebrew. The psalm was translated into the Greek Septuagint (about 250BC) in Hellenistic Egypt. There is a presence of Aramaisms in the psalm which has been interpreted by some biblical commentators as evidence of a late date, although this is not definitive. The psalm draws heavily from other psalms, so much so that the German commentator Hermann Hupfeld called it a "patched-up psalm".

Text

Hebrew Bible version 
Following is the Hebrew text of Psalm 116:

King James Version 
 I love the LORD, because he hath heard my voice and my supplications.
 Because he hath inclined his ear unto me, therefore will I call upon him as long as I live.
 The sorrows of death compassed me, and the pains of hell gat hold upon me: I found trouble and sorrow.
 Then called I upon the name of the LORD; O LORD, I beseech thee, deliver my soul.
 Gracious is the LORD, and righteous; yea, our God is merciful.
 The LORD preserveth the simple: I was brought low, and he helped me.
 Return unto thy rest, O my soul; for the LORD hath dealt bountifully with thee.
 For thou hast delivered my soul from death, mine eyes from tears, and my feet from falling.
 I will walk before the LORD in the land of the living.
 I believed, therefore have I spoken: I was greatly afflicted:
 I said in my haste, All men are liars.
 What shall I render unto the LORD for all his benefits toward me?
 I will take the cup of salvation, and call upon the name of the LORD.
 I will pay my vows unto the LORD now in the presence of all his people.
 Precious in the sight of the LORD is the death of his saints.
 O LORD, truly I am thy servant; I am thy servant, and the son of thine handmaid: thou hast loosed my bonds.
 I will offer to thee the sacrifice of thanksgiving, and will call upon the name of the LORD.
 I will pay my vows unto the LORD now in the presence of all his people.
 In the courts of the LORD's house, in the midst of thee, O Jerusalem. Praise ye the LORD.

Theme 
It is a question of the praise of the Lord by all peoples. The second verse expresses the reason for the first verse: the goodness of the Lord has been experienced in the past, and his faithfulness will last forever. If we take into consideration the whole book of psalms, we see that this psalm seems to sum up and conclude all the psalms of the hallel, and even all the preceding psalms from Psalm 107 onwards, for they invite Israel and all nations to praise "Eternal".

Authorship 
Theodoret in the fifth century applied this psalm to the distresses of the Jews in the times of the Maccabees under Antiochus Epiphanes, while a small minority ascribe it to Hezekiah's sickness, recorded in Isaiah 38; Alexander Kirkpatrick notes a similarity in the wording. However, most commentators today ascribe it to King David. If David were the author, it is not certain whether it was composed upon any particular occasion, or "upon a general review of the many gracious deliverances God had wrought for him". The Syriac Church holds it was written on the occasion of Saul coming to the cave where David was hiding.

Uses

Judaism 

This psalm is one of six psalms (113-118) of which Hallel is composed. On all days when Hallel is recited, this psalm is recited in its entirety, except on Rosh Chodesh and the last six days of Passover, when only verses 1-11 are recited. The word hallel means "praise". Since ancient times, the Egyptian Hallel has been used in the celebration of Passover.
Verse 13 is part of Havdalah.

New Testament 
Verse 10 of the Psalm was quoted by Paul the Apostle in 2 Corinthians .

Syriac Christianity 
The Syriac church applies it to converts coming into the church.

Catholicism 
The Psalm has been used as public prayer by Pope John Paul II, who called it a "Prayer of thanksgiving to the Lord". The Psalm is used in the Rule of St. Benedict. However, Psalm 117 is now read in the Liturgy of the Hours.

Protestant Christianity 
Matthew Henry calls it a thanksgiving psalm, while Charles Spurgeon saw it as "A Psalm of Thanksgiving in the Person of Christ". David Dickson wrote, "This Psalm is a threefold engagement of the Psalmist unto thanksgiving unto God, for his mercy unto him, and in particular for some notable delivery of him from death, both bodily and spiritual."

On February 3, 1788 Anglican Minister, Reverend Richard Johnson delivered the first Christian church service ever on Australian soil to convicts of the First Fleet. The text of his sermon was Psalm 116:12-14.

City motto 

The city of Belfast, Northern Ireland has as its motto Pro Tanto Quid Retribuamus, the Vulgate translation of Ps 116:12 ("what shall we give in return for so much?" or "What shall I return to the Lord for all his bounty to me?")

Notable verses 
 Verse 11, "In my haste I said all men are liars", can be read as an early statement of the liar paradox.
This verse has also been translated "I said in my fear, Every man is a liar." and "In an ecstasy of despair, I said, the whole race of man is a delusion." Some take the word חפז, (chaphaz) to denote haste or flight rather than fear. Samuel Horsley translates the verse as "an ecstasy of despair".
 I will sacrifice the sacrifices of praise 
 The cup of salvation  this phrase has been used by Catholics as prophetic of the eucharist. While some see this as similar to the modern Jewish ceremony held every year in commemoration of the deliverance of their ancestors from the bondage of Egypt. Others see this portion as reference to morning drink offering in Solomon's temple under Mosaic law (Numbers 28:7), inferring the writer is now making an offering of thanks for being delivered. Others think the verse may have inspired Jesus  at the last supper, or Paul's "cup of blessing".

Musical settings 
A collection Angst der Hellen und Friede der Seelen ("Fear of Hell and Peace of the Soul") combines sixteen motet settings of Psalm 116 in German, "Das ist mir lieb" (That is dear to me). It was commissioned by the Jena merchant Burckhard Grossmann in 1616, and published in 1623. The composers are Heinrich Schütz, Michael Altenburg, Christoph Demantius, Nicolaus Erich, Andreas Finold, Melchior Franck, Abraham Gensreff, Johannes Groh, Johann Krause, Christian Michael, Daniel Michael, Rogier Michael, Tobias Michael, Michael Praetorius, Johann Hermann Schein and Caspar Trost.

Marc-Antoine Charpentier set Psalmus David 115 (in Vulgate numbering), Credidi propter quod locutus sum, H. 209 - H. 209a, for soloists, chorus and continuo in 1690. Anton Bruckner composed a setting of the first nine verses as Psalm 114 "Alleluja! Liebe erfüllt mich", WAB 36, in 1852. Franz Schreker composed a setting of Psalm 116 for three-part women's choir and orchestra as his Op. 6 in 1900.

References

External links 

 
 
 Psalms Chapter 116 text in Hebrew and English, mechon-mamre.org
 Text of Psalm 116 according to the 1928 Psalter
United States Conference of Catholic Bishops, I love the LORD, who listened / to my voice in supplication, text and footnotes, usccb.org 
 Psalm 116:1 introduction and text, biblestudytools.com
 Psalm 116 – Paying the Vow of Gratitude enduringword.com
 Psalm 116 / Refrain: Gracious is the Lord and righteous. Church of England
 Psalm 116 at biblegateway.com
 Charles Spurgeon: Psalm 116 detailed commentary, archive.spurgeon.org
 

116
Hallel